Lykaia is the third album by Swedish progressive metal band Soen. It was released on 3 February 2017 via UDR Music. It was produced by new guitarist Marcus Jidell (Avatarium) that played in this album only. It was also the first album with keyboardist Lars Åhlund.

The album was preceded by the singles "Sectarian" on 15 December 2016, "Lucidity" on 24 January, and "Opal" on 25 February 2017.

Track listing
All tracks written by Soen.

Personnel
Martin Lopez – drums, percussion
Joel Ekelöf – vocals
Stefan Stenberg – bass
Lars Åhlund - organ, Rhodes
Marcus Jidell – guitars, production

Additional personnel
Andreas Tengberg – violin, cello
David Castillo – recording
Stefan Boman – mixing
Ulf Schmidt – guitar technician
Rickard Gustafsson – drums technician
Alvaro Cubero – artwork
Martin Hummel-Gradén – album design
Carl Göthammar – Soen snake logo

Charts

References

2017 albums
Soen albums